Vedanta Limited is an Indian multinational mining company headquartered in Mumbai, India, with its main operations in iron ore, gold and aluminium mines in Goa, Karnataka, Rajasthan and Odisha.

History

Sterlite Industries
Vedanta (then called Sterlite industries) began in the 1980s, as the founder D.P.Agarwal founded Sterlite Industries (India) Limited in Mumbai and begun to buy mining concessions in different states of India. He was soon joined by his two sons, Navin Agarwal and Sunil Agarwal, both of whom currently run the company. In 1992, they established Volcan investments in Nassau (Bahamas) as the main holding company for their mines. D.P.Agarwal had a small aluminium conductor business in Patna. His son Anil Agarwal had come to Mumbai to expand their business.

In the 1990s, as the Indian government began to sell off sick (non-performing) companies, Sterlite began to bid for them. They were able to bid successfully for BALCO and Hindustan Zinc Limited, both bankrupt companies that had been closed down for 4 years. Meanwhile, in January 1993, D. P. Agarwal founded Twinstar Holdings Limited in Mauritius, which was mostly owned by Volcan investments. On 26 May 2002, the Enforcement Directorate filed a show cause notice with Sterlite, relating to the six-year period between 1993 and 1999 when Twinstar acquired the shares of Sterlite and various investment companies – such as Dwarka Prasad Anil Kumar Investments Private Limited, Pravin Navin Investment & Trading Private Limited and Sterlite Copper Rolling Mills Private Limited – which, in turn, had made substantial investments in Sterlite and another group company, Madras Aluminium Company Limited (MALCO) after obtaining permission from the Reserve Bank of India (RBI). On 29 April 1999, many of these investment companies were liquidated and all the shares of Sterlite came back to Twinstar's possession. Twinstar became the 100% owner of shares in these investment companies and received government approvals from the RBI as well as the Foreign Investment Promotion Board (FIPB).

On 8 December 1999, officials of the Income Tax department raided the offices of Sterlite located at Dhanraj Mahal, Apollo Bunder and Tulsiani Chambers, Mumbai, and seized many documents. The IT department then decided to engage the services of ED officials as it appeared that there could have been a violation of the country's foreign exchange laws. After analyzing these documents, the ED inferred that Twinstar was incorporated with the sole intention of acquiring an interest in Sterlite. The Directorate alleged that the Agarwals, before liquidating the shares of the investment companies mentioned, had written off loans worth 230 million and made an agreement to gift their overseas corporate body, Twinstar, a sum of 338 million including shares of Sterlite worth 72 million. Between 1993 and 1999, Sterlite and its investment companies allegedly brought in 2.08 billion to India through Twinstar to subscribe to the shares of Sterlite and make investments in the company.

Sesa Goa – Scambi (1954–1963)
The company today known as Sesa Goa was founded in 1954, as Scambi Economici SA Goa. Since then, it gradually grew to become a large low-cost producer of iron ore. During 1991–1995, it diversified into the manufacture of pig iron and metallurgical coke. Scambi Economici Societa Anonyma (SESA), owned by Baron Ludovic Toeplitz, with the financial backing of Alessandro Vassalo, obtained the Orasso Dongor mining lease in Sirsaim, Goa in 1954 and Sesa Goa Limited was formed. It was bought over in 1955, with equal shareholding, by Gewerkeshaft Exploration e Bergbau and Ferromin S.p.A., a subsidiary of Finsider S.p.A. (of IRI group), which eventually acquired the other half stake in 1963.

Sesa Goa (1963–2007)
Sesa Goa Limited was incorporated as a private limited company in 1963 under The Companies Act, 1956. In 1979, Sesa Goa Private Limited was formed, with the merger of Sesa Goa Limited with another mining company in Goa, Mingoa Sociedade Miniera Goesa S.a.r.l. By 1965, Sesa Goa and Mingoa were incorporated as a private limited company under The Companies Act, 1956. The merger happened in 1979 and the new, unified company was called 'Sesa Goa Pvt Ltd'. The company went public in 1981 with 42,000 Indian shareholders, holding 60% of its shares and the remaining 40% held by Finsider International, which later became ILVA International. Sesa Goa had started with iron mining as its core business but slowly, it ventured into barge construction in 1984 at Sirsaim, located in the Bardez taluka of North Goa. Since then, the barge construction unit has been developed into a shipbuilding division.

In the 1990s, Sesa Goa began further expansion, aided by an influx of foreign investment during the economic liberalization of India enforced by the World Bank and IMF. In 1992, the first phase of a 150,000 ton pig iron plant was commissioned. In the same year, Sesa introduced India's first low-phosphorus foundry grade pig iron in India and subsequently formalised the business under pig iron division. The pig iron plant was located at Amona, Goa and had an annual production capacity of 250,000 tonnes per annum.
Other alliances were formed in the nineties—in January 1995, Sesa Shipping was launched by acquiring a transhipper M.V. Orissa. The year also saw the inclusion of 84 new coke ovens. When Mitsui & Co. of Japan bought Finsider International in 1996, it gained 51% stake in Sesa Go. By 1997, Sesa Kembla became a 100% subsidiary of Sesa Goa.

In 1997, A Narrain mines located in Chitradurga, (Karnataka) were purchased. A Supreme Court directive in August 2011 led to suspension of mining activities in the region. In 1999, Sesa Goa started mining operations in Barbil, which has the fifth largest deposit of iron ore and manganese in the world. They started producing iron ore which was exported from the port towns of Haldia and Paradip. During this time, the company also started the Sesa Community Development Foundation that supported the NCM Sesa Technical School and a football academy called SESA F.A.

During the end of the 90s, the company also began to consolidate through mergers and acquisitions. Sesa Kembla completed the creation of an indigenous and environment-friendly technology that produced high-quality metallurgical coke. This technology generated power as a by-product. In 2003, the Sesa Goa equity in Sesa Industries was raised to 88.25%, impacting the shareholding pattern.

Take over by Vedanta (2007)
In 2007, Vedanta Resources Plc, a diversified metals and mining group founded by Anil Agarwal, acquired 51% controlling stake in Sesa Goa Ltd. from Mitsui & Co. Ltd. Vedanta Resources is listed on the London Stock Exchange and a constituent of FTSE 100 Index. The deal was worth , making it the largest M&A deal in the industry so far.
This was the second largest acquisition in India's iron-ore industry, and it gave Sesa Goa access to Dempo's 70 million tons of iron-ore mineable resources in Goa. In 2011, Sesa Goa purchased 51% stake in Western Cluster, Liberia for $90 million.
The Liberia Gola Forest Community people who also suffered from the civil war believe that the coming of Western Cluster will help to alleviate their suffering and provide employment.

In 2007, it became a majority-owned subsidiary of Vedanta Resources Plc, listed on the London Stock Exchange, when Vedanta acquired 51% controlling stake from Mitsui & Co., Ltd. In June 2009, Sesa Goa Limited acquired VS Dempo & Co. Private Limited (now Sesa Resources Limited) along with its fully owned subsidiary Dempo Mining Corporation (now Vedanta Limited) and 50% equity in Goa Maritime Private Limited. In 2010, Vedanta acquired the zinc assets of British miner Anglo American plc.

In 2011 Vedanta Resources bought 58.5% controlling stake in Cairn India, India's largest private sector oil & gas company. In 2015, Sterlite Industries and Sesa Goa announced their merger and finally merged into a single entity in August 2015. In 2015, Sesa Sterlite changed its name to Vedanta Limited. On 11 April 2017, Cairn India merged with Vedanta Limited to consolidate its position as one of the largest diversified natural resources companies in the world.

In 2018 Vedanta Limited acquired control of Electrosteels Steels Limited. Electrosteel Steels had been constructing an integrated steel plant at Siyaljori in Jharkhand.

In May 2020, it is declared that company is going to delist from Indian bourses as per the comment by Mr. Anil Agarwal.

In September 2022, Vedanta signed a pact with Foxconn as a technical partner to invest  to set up semiconductor and display production plants in Gujarat. The venture intends to start manufacturing display and chip products within two years. The investment follows the Indian government commitment to expand incentives beyond an initial $10billion plan for those investing in manufacturing of semiconductors.

Vedanta

Operations
Though the company primarily operated in Goa and Karnataka, it has gradually expanded its operations in recent years to Odisha, Rajasthan, Chhattisgarh, Tamil Nadu, Punjab Gujarat and Andhra Pradesh.

Vedanta limited owns, leases and operates in India through the following entities:
 Bharat Aluminium Company: In February 2001, Government of India in a major dis-investment deal, approved the sale of its 51% stake in BALCO to Sterlite Industries (now Vedanta Limited) for Rs.551.5 crores. The government of India owns the remaining 49.0%. Incorporated in 1965, BALCO was a profit making Public Sector Company which had played a crucial role in increasing the usage of aluminium over a wide spectrum of products ranging from household utensils to aerospace and defense sectors. BALCO is headquartered at Korba in the state of Chhattisgarh and is a vertically integrated aluminium producer having its own captive bauxite mines, captive power plants and smelter.
 Hindustan Zinc: HZL is headquartered in Udaipur in the state of Rajasthan. HZL's equity shares are listed and traded on the NSE and BSE. Vedanta owns 64.9% of the share capital in HZL and has management control. Sterlite has a call option to acquire the government of India's remaining ownership interest.
 Sterlite Copper (Tuticorin): Sterlite is registered office headquartered in Tuticorin, Tamil Nadu, India. Sterlite has been a public listed company in India since 1988, and its equity shares are listed and traded on the NSE and the BSE, and are also listed and traded on the NYSE in the form of ADSs. Vedanta owns 53.9% of Sterlite and has management control of the company. Protest by Public of Tuticorin started for not following Environmental Clearance Issues. The Tamil Nadu Pollution Control Board (TNPCB) accused the factory of releasing noxious gas in the air. It said sulphur-di-oxide levels had gone off the charts on the night of 23 March in the year 2013. It showed a reading of 2939.55 mg/cubic metre against the prescribed limit of 1250 mg/ cubic metre more people were affected by cancer and other breathing disorders but the Indian government did not take any action.
 Twin star (a Mauritius-based offshore holding company that owns sizable parts of Vedanta limited)
 Cairn India and Cairn energy India (oil and offshore exploration)
 Mines in Goa (currently frozen statewide) and Karnataka (owned by Vedanta limited)
 Electrosteel Steels limited, Jharkhand (through Vedanta star, a holding company)
 Talwandi Sabo power limited (a thermal power plant in Mansa, near Bathinda, Punjab)
 Vedanta Aluminium: Vedanta Aluminium is headquartered in Jharsuguda, Odisha. Vedanta owns 70.5% of the share capital of Vedanta Aluminium and Sterlite owns the remaining 29.5% share capital of Vedanta Aluminium. Vedanta Aluminium produces ingots, billets & wire rods that are sold in the markets around the world. Vedanta Aluminium Limited (VAL) has acquired a 24.5% stake in L & T subsidiary Raykal Aluminium. Based on achieving certain milestones, Vedanta Aluminium will fully acquire Raykal Aluminium in phases. Vedanta is undertaking an expansion program. It plans to produce around 1.5 million tonnes of aluminium in the fiscal year 2016-17 from its Jharsuguda and Korba smelters which will make it the largest aluminium producer in India. Its alumina refinery, located in Lanjigarh, plans to produce 1.5 million tonnes of alumina and depending on availability of domestic bauxite will subsequently ramp it up to 4 million tonnes per annum in the near future. Despite NGO sponsored activism, the Lanjigarh smelter has seen a lot of support from the local people who see it as an important source of employment and livelihood.
Madras Aluminium Company: MALCO is headquartered in Mettur, India. MALCO's equity shares are listed and traded on the NSE and BSE. It owns 93.9% of MALCO's share capital and has management control of the company.

Shareholding pattern
As of 30 June 2018, the company is owned 50% by the promoters (under Finsider international and Twinstar holding, both holding companies owned under the names of 12 members of the Agarwal family) and 50% by the public. The promoters ownership (51%) is held under "Westglobe limited" under "Twinstar holdings" (37%) and Finsider international (11%). The balance 49% of the company is owned by mutual funds (ICICI Prudential), foreign portfolio investors (17%), Corporate bodies (7%), LIC India (6%), Citibank New York (4%), individual retail shareholders (5%) and Citibank NYADR (4%).

Relationship with Sesa Goa: Sesa Goa was originally a Portuguese owned company, with iron ore mines in Goa. In the 1990s, Sesa Goa was purchased by Sterlite industries (subsequently renamed as Vedanta Limited).

Vedanta Management has shared its intentions to delist company from stock exchanges subject to Shareholders approval. However, delisting is a lengthy process and may take years.

Relationship with Cairns India and Carins energy: In 2016, Cairns India and Cairns Energy were purchased by Vedanta Limited. Cairns was a US-owned company and the 2nd largest private oil and gas company in India.

Products 
Copper: Vedanta limited operates the largest copper smelter In India, in Tuticorin. This contributes to nearly 50% of Vedanta Limited's profits. In early 2016, due to local protests related to environment pollution, the plant was temporarily shut down by the Tamil Nadu state government. Vedanta has contested these claims, stating that its gas emissions are well below the state norms and the emissions of 11 other neighboring industries. It has also stated that their plant does not pump any water into the sea, due to a change in the plant configuration after a previous (2013) complaints from the state government.

Zinc-Lead-Silver: Zinc India business is owned and operated by Hindustan Zinc Limited (HZL). HZL owns and operates a fully integrated zinc-lead business. HZL is one of the world's largest integrated zinc-lead producers by volume. Sesa Sterlite owns 64.9% of the share capital of HZL, while the Government of India remains an equity partner and holds a 29.5% stake. HZL is listed on Indian stock exchanges (NSE and BSE).HZL's fully integrated zinc operations include five lead-zinc mines, one rock phosphate mine, four hydrometallurgical zinc smelters, two lead smelters, one lead-zinc smelter, four sulphuric acid plants, one silver refinery and six captive power plants at our Chanderiya, Dariba and Zawar facilities in the State of Rajasthan, processing and refining facilities for zinc at Haridwar and for zinc, lead and silver at Pantnagar, both in the State of Uttarakhand and in northern India. In FY 2013, these operations delivered 870,000 tonnes of mined zinc-lead metal-in-concentrate, and 802,000 tonnes of refined zinc and lead.

Oil & Gas: Sesa Sterlite's Oil & Gas operations comprise the assets of Cairn India in India, Sri Lanka and South Africa. Cairn India is India's largest private-sector crude oil producer, contributing to over 25% of India's crude oil production.
Sesa Sterlite owns 58.9% of Cairn India, which is also the fastest-growing Asian E&P company (Platts 2011) and one of the top 20 independent E&P companies worldwide. Cairn India has interest in eight blocks in India, one in Sri Lanka and one in South Africa. Cairn India's resource base is located in four areas – the onshore RJ-ON-90/1 (Rajasthan) block, two blocks on the west coast of India, four blocks on the east coast of India (including one in Sri Lanka) and one block in South Africa. Cairn India's Rajasthan block is the largest onshore discovery in India in the last 20 years and has an estimated 7.3 billion barrels of oil equivalent in place with a basin potential to support a production rate of 300,000 barrels of oil per day. Cairn India has a strong track record of exploration, with nearly 50% exploration success ratio. It has initiated an exploration and appraisal programme to unlock further potential in the proven Rajasthan block. Cairn India has a planned net capital investment of US$3 billion through FY2016, with around 80% of this investment allocated for the Rajasthan block. The company has recently commenced gas sales from the Rajasthan Block. Sesa Sterlite's Oil & Gas operations comprise the assets of Cairn India in India, Sri Lanka and South Africa. Cairn India is India's largest private sector crude oil producer, contributing to over 25% of India's crude oil production.

Iron Ore:Sesa Sterlite is largest private sector exporter of iron ore in India and is developing large iron ore deposits in Liberia.
Iron ore mining operations are carried out in the Indian States of Goa and Karnataka. We also manufacture pig iron and metallurgical coke. During FY 2013, our Indian iron ore operations were affected by a suspension of iron ore mining activities across the states of Goa and Karnataka. The Honourable Supreme Court allowed resumption of Karnataka mine in April, 13 subject to statutory clearances. Subsequent to receiving all the approvals they have started mining in Karnataka from 28 December 13. In 2011, Sesa Goa limited had acquired iron ore assets in Liberia, with around 1 billion in reserves and resources across three deposits – Bomi Hills, Bea Mountain and Mano River, located at a distance of 70–140 kilometers from the port at Monrovia. Extensive drilling at our Liberia assets has confirmed a billion tonne of Iron Ore deposit last year with further multifold upside. Currently, they are reviewing the different phased options including the first phase of 2 million tons. Sesa Sterlite is the largest private sector exporter of iron ore in India. Its subsidiary, Western Cluster Ltd is developing large iron ore deposits in Liberia.

Their copper business is principally a custom smelting operation located in India and Australia. Our Indian operations include a smelter, refinery, phosphoric acid plant, sulphuric acid plant and copper rod plant at Thoothukudi in southern India. Sesa Sterlite owns 100% of the Mt. Lyell copper mine in Tasmania, Australia, which produces a portion of the total requirement of copper concentrate at our Indian Operations. Production of cathodes at our Copper India business was 353kt in FY 2013. Our Australian operations produced 26kt of mined metal in FY 2013. Sesa Sterlite copper business is located in India. It also owns 100% stake in Copper Mines of Tasmania Pty Ltd, Australia.

Aluminium: BALCO has a smelter capacity of 345 ktpa with capabilities to produce ingots, wire-rods, billets, busbars and rolled products.
BALCO's operations include mines, refineries, smelters and captive power plants in the state of Chhattisgarh in India. Sesa Sterlite holds a controlling 51% stake in BALCO, while the Government of India remains an equity partner and holds the remaining 49% stake. The Korba-II Balco smelter produces 245 ktpa of aluminium and they are expanding production capacity to 570 ktpa with the commencement of the new Korba-III 325 ktpa smelter in FY 2014.BALCO's current operations have access to captive power from 540 MW thermal power plant. A new 1,200 MW power plant is expected to commence production soon. Beside this company has 1.75MTPA of aluminium manufacturing unit at Jharsuguda, Odisha.. Vedanta's aluminium output rises 2% to 584,000 tonnes in second Qtr of FY23

Power: Sesa Sterlite is one of India's leading power producers with a capacity of 3,900 MW in commercial power.
They have commercial power generation business that currently operates 2,400 MW Jharsuguda Power Plant in Odisha, 270 MW BALCO power plant in Chhattisgarh, 100 MW MALCO power plant in Tamil Nadu and 274 MW HZL wind power plants at various locations in India. They are also setting up a 1,980 MW Talwandi Sabo power plant in the state of Punjab. Talwandi Sabo Power Limited, a 100% subsidiary of Sesa Sterlite is setting up a 1,980 MW thermal power project in Punjab, with the first unit starting operations by Q3 FY2014. Hindustan Zinc has 274 MW of wind power generational capacity, making it one of the largest producers of wind power in India. MALCO operates a 100 MW plant.

Metallurgical Coke: Approximately 65% of total production is consumed by Sesa group, for its pig iron production. The remainder is sold to customers located in India.
Sesa Goa has patented a technology that provides high quality output and produces power. It is patented and follows a two-product process with metallurgical coke as the main product and the sensible heat of the exhaust flue gas as a co-product. This heat can be used for producing clean electricity. The company uses non-polluting, non-recovery Australian Technology. At the plant in Amona, negative pressure in the ovens ensures no polluting leakages.

Pig Iron: This business is skewed towards catering to the steel mills and foundries of the Indian market, in particular the Western and Southern India. The division manufactures basic, foundry and nodular grade pig iron and also sells slag. The annual production capacity is 250,000 tons per annum.

CSR & Sustainability 
Vedanta invested US$37 million towards community development in 2015–16, benefitting over 2.25 million people globally. The Confederation of Indian Industry (CII) ranked Vedanta Limited and its subsidiary Hindustan Zinc among the top ten sustainable firms in India. In FY2016, Vedanta recycled 47% of the fly ash generated through operations, as well as recycled 23% of the water utilized during its operations.

The company has entered into a first of its kind, unique Public-Private-Partnership (PPP), with the Ministry of Women and Child Development, Government of India to start Project Nandghar all over the country. This project aims to modernize and construct the Anganwadi infrastructure in India. With the aim to supplement inclusive economic growth in India, Vedanta focuses on women empowerment through its CSR initiatives. The company's CSR initiatives 32,600 rural women through the creation of about 1,500 Self Help Groups in the communities, across the locations of its operations.

Controversies

2001 SEBI case
In 2001, Sterlite industries, BPL and Videocon were found guilty by the Securities Exchange Board of India (SEBI) of having colluded with the broker Harshad Mehta and 17 brokers (10 from BSE and 7 from NSE) in a bid to corner shares and rig shares prices. This resulted in a ban on Sterlite from accessing capital markets for 2 years. Subsequent to this, in 2003, Vedanta Resources (UK) was listed on the London Stock Exchange. Vedanta Resources itself is a holding company that owns many entities including a large proportion of Vedanta Limited and Sterlite industries.

Tuticorin Sterlite protests
In early 2018, thousands of residents of Tuticorin began to protest against the Sterlite plant located in the industrial complex there. The protests continued for three months and began to draw the attention of the media as well as local political parties who began to instigate as well as mobilise locals. Most of the protests were related to what locals perceived to be pollution from the Sterlite factory. The managers of Sterlite countered that there were another four similar plants adjacent to them, and that they were complying with all government regulations. There was little equipment, either with the plant or with the government to take actual measurements of the air in the vicinity. Sterlite further countered that contrary to the rumours that were being circulated, they did not pump any water from the plant into the sea which lay more than 10 kilometers away. In April 2018, the Government of Tamil Nadu placed an order to close down the factory. This order was temporarily cancelled by the district collector.

In May 2018, amidst ongoing protests by thousands of people, matters turned rough one day and the police opened fire on demonstrators. The firing killed 13 people and protesters turned violent, burning vehicles and structures. Residents say the copper smelter is causing environmental damage. Subsequent to the firing, the Tamil Nadu chief minister Palaniswami ordered a judicial inquiry into the shootings but defended the police response.

Awards 
Vedanta Aluminium received the prestigious recognition of "Indian Affairs India's Most Valuable Aluminum Producing Company of the Year 2018" & Its CEO Abhijit Pati in the category of “Indian Affairs Innovative CEO of the year 2018” at the Satya Brahma iconic 9th Annual India Leadership Conclave 2018 in Mumbai.

Offices

The registered office and corporate office of Vedanta Limited are based in Mumbai. The company has offices in New Delhi, NCR as well as across its operations in the country.

See also
 Mining in India
 List of mines in India

References

External links
 
 Group homepage

Iron ore mining in India
Vedanta Resources
Companies based in Goa
1954 establishments in Portuguese India
Iron ore mining companies of India
Companies listed on the New York Stock Exchange
Mining companies of India
Oil and gas companies of India
Companies listed on the National Stock Exchange of India
Companies listed on the Bombay Stock Exchange